The 1908 Iowa Hawkeyes football team represented the University of Iowa as a member of the Missouri Valley Conference (MVC) and the Western Conference during the 1908 college football season. Led by Mark Catlin Sr. in his third and final season as head coach, the Hawkeyes compiled an overall record of 2–5 with a mark of 0–4 in MVC play, placing last of seven teams in the MVC. Iowa was 0–1 against Western Conference opponents, finishing sixth in that conference.

Schedule

References

Iowa
Iowa
Iowa Hawkeyes football seasons
Iowa Hawkeyes football